Kongara Jaggayya (31 December 1928 – 5 March 2004) was an Indian actor, littérateur, journalist, lyricist, dubbing artist and politician known for his works predominantly in Telugu cinema and Telugu theatre. He was known as Kanchu Kantam Jaggayya (Telugu) for his booming voice. In a film career spanning forty years as a matinee idol, he starred in eighty films, as a lead actor, and lead antagonist in a variety of genres. In 1967, he was elected as a member of the fourth Lok Sabha, from the constituency of Ongole, becoming the first Indian film actor to be elected as a member of the Parliament.

During his early career he portrayed breakthrough characters in works such as Donga Ramudu (1955), which was archived by the Film and Television Institute of India, He starred in award-winning works such as Bangaru Papa (1954), Ardhangi (1955), Edi Nijam (1956), Todi Kodallu (1957),  Dr. Chakravarti (1964), Antastulu (1965), the Cannes Film Festival featured Meghasandesam (1982), and Seethakoka Chiluka (1981); all of which won the National Film Award for Best Feature Films in Telugu. In 1962, he co-produced and starred in the political drama film Padandi Munduku based on Salt March, the film was screened at the International Film Festival of India, the Tashkent Film Festival, and got a special mention at the 5th Moscow International Film Festival.

As a character actor he received critical appreciation for his performance in notable works such as Velugu Needalu (1961), Chitti Tammudu (1962),  Aaradhana (1962), Aatma Balam (1964), Sumangali (1965), Gudi Gantalu (1965), Nava ratri (1966), Aame Evaru? (1966),  Aastiparulu (1966), Jarigina Katha (1969), Bala Mitrula Katha (1972), Badi Pantulu (1972), Bharya Biddalu (1972), Devudu Chesina Manushulu (1973). He portrayed British official Rutherford in the biographical film Alluri Sita Rama Raju (1974), and essayed Pontius Pilate in the hagiographical film Karunamayudu (1978). He then appeared in works such as Veta (1986), Chantabbai (1986), Pasivadi Pranam (1987), Dharma Kshetram (1992) and Bobbili Simham (1994). He has won the Andhra Pradesh state Nandi Award for Best Character Actor for his works in some of these films. A recipient of the Tamil Nadu state's Kalaimamani, the Government of India has honored him with the Padma Bhushan in 1992 for his contributions towards Indian cinema.

Early life 
Jaggayya was born on 31 December 1928 to Seetaramaih and Rajya Lakshmamma in Morampudi village near Tenali in Guntur district. He quoted on several occasions in his essays the influence his father had on his interest towards arts. He started acting at the age of 11, with the role of Lava in a Hindi play during his high school days in Duggirala. He got trained in the art of painting under the guidance of Adivi Bapiraju, a noted painter, during his college days.

As a student, he joined the Congress Socialist party in Tenali, which was involved in the Indian Independence Movement at that time.

He joined the Andhra-Christian College, in 1942, in Guntur for his higher studies. He used to be a member of Navya Sahitya Parishath in Guntur. Later he joined a periodical named Desabhimani (meaning "Patriot") as a journalist. Later he worked as an editor for the weekly Andhra Republic. During his B.A. days in A-C College, he along with N. T. Rama Rao, acted in several plays. He also used to be a part of Navajyothi Artists, a cultural organisation run by Mukkamala. After working as a teacher in Duggirala for a brief while, he became a news announcer in Akashavani for three years. Jaggayya won the best actor award in three successive years for Chesina Papam and Telangana.

Film career 
He made his cinematic debut in 1952 drama film Priyuralu directed by Tripuraneni Gopichand. This movie was produced by Donepudi Krishnamurthy, also known popularly as Gokul Krishnamurthy. He quit the job as news announcer as he signed three movies on a trot. His second movie, Adarsham, didn't do well at box office. His planned third movie Paleru did not even see light of the day.

Bangaru Papa, directed by B N Reddy, released in 1955, was the first breakthrough film for Jaggayya. He was distinguished for his booming voice and contributed as a voice artist for more than hundred feature films. He dubbed in Telugu language for veteran Sivaji Ganesan. He was the narrator, and dubbing artist for internationally recognized works such as Maa Bhoomi, and Richard Attenborough's character of John Hammond in the Telugu-dubbed version of the Hollywood film Jurassic Park. He acted in almost 100 films as a lead, 100 more as a co-lead and almost 200 films as a character artist. He was a part of almost every film of VB Rajendra Parasad's Jagapathi Pictures,  K B Tilak's Anupama Pictures and Ramavijeta Films owned by brothers Prabhakar and Baburao.  His last film as an actor was Kunthi Putrudu, which starred Mohan Babu as lead and was directed by Dasari Narayana Rao.

He turned into producer with a film Padandi Munduku, under the banner of Jagruthi Chitra. The film was released in January 1962 and was a regarded as first Telugu social film made on the basis of Indian Independence movement.

He was awarded the 'Kala Vachaspathi' for his sonorous voice.

Political career 
Jaggayya was active in politics right from his student days and was allied with the socialist group within the Congress party. When the group was disbanded, he joined Jayaprakash Narayan's Praja Socialist Party, but returned to Congress in 1956, heeding the call of Jawaharlal Nehru. In 1967, he was elected as a member of the fourth Lok Sabha, the lower house of the Parliament of India from the constituency of Ongole on a Congress Party ticket. He was the first Indian film actor to be elected as a member of parliament.

Literary achievements 
He translated Nobel laureate Rabindranath Tagore's Geetanjali and multiple poems into Telugu under the name Ravindra Geetha. He also translated Tagore's play "Sacrifice" into Telugu under the name Balidaanam. He also co-founded Manasvini Charitable Trust to honor the film literature of Acharya Aatreya. The lyrics of all the film songs written by Athreya was consolidated into seven volumes.

Death 
Jagayya died on 5 March 2004 in Chennai, Tamilnadu.

Awards 
Civilian honours
 Padma Bhushan, Government of India in 1992

Nandi Awards
Nandi Award for Best Character Actor

State Awards
Andhra Pradesh Government cash award for producing Padandi Munduku in 1962
 Title of Kalaimamani from Tamil Nadu government

Other honours
 Title of Kala Vachaspathi from the Sanskrit Viswa Vidyalaya, Delhi
 Title of Kala Prapoorna from Andhra University, Visakhapatnam
 Honorary D.Litt. from the Telugu University, Hyderabad

Filmography

Death 
He underwent a Hip Replacement surgery and complications after the surgery resulted in his death.

References

External links 

1926 births
2004 deaths
People from Tenali
Telugu male actors
Indian actor-politicians
Nandi Award winners
Indian male voice actors
Indian male screenwriters
Indian socialists
Male actors from Andhra Pradesh
Indian male film actors
India MPs 1967–1970
20th-century Indian male actors
Male actors in Telugu cinema
Recipients of the Padma Bhushan in arts
Indian male dramatists and playwrights
Indian National Congress politicians from Andhra Pradesh
20th-century Indian dramatists and playwrights
Praja Socialist Party politicians
Lok Sabha members from Andhra Pradesh
Dramatists and playwrights from Andhra Pradesh
20th-century Indian translators
20th-century Indian screenwriters